Claud Adkins Hatcher (August 20, 1876 – December 31, 1933) was an American pharmacist, businessman, and inventor from Columbus, Georgia, who is best known for creating RC Cola and other soft drinks.

Background 
Claud Adkins Hatcher was born on August 20, 1876, in Quitman County, Georgia, to Lucius Adkins Hatcher and Eleanor Moore King. Hatcher had originally intended to become a doctor, but he changed his studies after his first year in college and soon thereafter became a graduate pharmacist from the University of Louisville School of Medicine. By 1901, Hatcher had established himself as a successful pharmacist, operating two pharmacies in Preston, Georgia, and Dawson, Georgia. However, later that year, Hatcher left the pharmaceutical field to join his father, a wholesale grocer who had recently started a new wholesale grocery store in Columbus, Georgia. Founded as the Cole-Hatcher-Hampton Grocery Company, the company was soon renamed to the Hatcher Grocery Company after Claud and his father bought out the other investors in the company.

Creating RC Cola 

Created in 1886, Coca-Cola had grown immensely in popularity in the decades that followed, and the product was sold in great quantities at the Hatchers' grocery store. However, following a disagreement with the Columbus representative of the Coca-Cola Company over wholesale pricing, Hatcher stopped carrying the product in his store and began developing his own soft drink in a laboratory in the basement of the grocery store. In 1905, Hatcher introduced a ginger ale called Royal Crown Ginger Ale as an alternative to Coca-Cola. Shortly thereafter, Hatcher created Chero-Cola, a cherry cola designed to compete directly with Coca-Cola. Following a reformulation in 1934, Chero-Cola was renamed Royal Crown Cola, later shortened to just RC Cola.

Along with these two products, Hatcher developed a line of several other flavored sodas under the Royal Crown moniker. In 1905, Hatcher formed Union Bottling Works, a company to bottle these products. The company was renamed to the Chero-Cola Company in 1912. In 1924, the company introduce the Nehi line of fruit-flavored sodas, and the company was shortly thereafter renamed after this popular line.

Later life 
Hatcher died on December 31, 1933, at the age of 57 and was buried in the Riverdale Cemetery in Muscogee County, Georgia. His will established the Pickett & Hatcher Educational Fund, a non-profit student lender.

References

External links
 

American pharmacists
20th-century American inventors
American philanthropists
People from Columbus, Georgia
1876 births
1933 deaths
University of Louisville School of Medicine alumni
People from Quitman County, Georgia